This is a list of all of the songs that The Alchemist has produced.

1996

Dilated Peoples
 "Third Degree" (featuring Defari)

1998

Defari - Focused Daily
 "Focused Daily"
 "Killing Spree"
 "Checkstand 3"

Buc Fifty - Still Breathin'/Dead End Street
 "Still Breathin'"
 "Dead End Street"

Baron Ricks
 "Harlem River Drive"

The High & Mighty – Eastern Conference Finals
 "Open Mic Night"
 "E = mc2"

1999

Terror Squad - Terror Squad
 "99 Live"
 "Bring It On"

Group Home - A Tear for the Ghetto
 "Stupid Muthafuckas (30 Minutes to War)"

The High & Mighty - Home Field Advantage
 "Top Prospects"
 "Open Mic Night" (Remix)

Sun, Moon, & Stars/The Conflict
 "The Conflict"

Rascalz - Global Warning
 "On The Run"

Swollen Members - Balance
 "Front Street"
 "Circuit Breaker"
 "Strength"
 "Horrified Nights"

Mobb Deep - Murda Muzik
 "Thug Muzik"
 "The Realest"

Pharoahe Monch - Internal Affairs
 "No Mercy"

Royce da 5'9" - Build and Destroy
 "I'm the King"
 "I Won't Be"
 "U Don't Know Me"

Maylay Sparks - Crazy
 "It's Ours"

Agallah
 "The Crookie Monster"

Sean Boston
 "What The F#*!(Going On In Here)"

2000

Missin' Linx - Exhibit A
 "Family Ties" (featuring Freddie Foxxx)

Dilated Peoples - The Platform
 "The Platform"
 "Guaranteed"
 "The Main Event"
 "Annihilation"
 "The Last Line of Defense"

Prodigy - H.N.I.C.
 "Keep It Thoro"
 "Three"
 "Trials of Love"
 "Veteran's Memorial"

Capone-N-Noreaga - The Reunion
 "Queens"
 "Bang Bang"

Everlast - Eat at Whitey's
 "Deadly Assassins"

Lyricist Lounge 2
 "The Grimy Way" (Big Noyd & Prodigy)
 "Right & Exact" (Dilated Peoples)

Queensbridge Finest
 "Money" (Mr. Challace)

Tony Touch - The Piece Maker
 "Get Back" (Eminem & D12)
 "Basics" (Prodigy)
 "Cormega Interlude"

Capone
 "Ride 4 Em"

Buc Fifty - Bad Man VLS
 "Electric Chair Rhymin'"

Severe
 "If Words Could Kill"
 "My Way"

Buc Fifty
 "Jacked For Your Fans"

Freddie Foxxx - Industry Shakedown 
 "Tell 'Em I'm Here"
 "Stock In This Game"

2001

Smut Peddlers - Porn Again
 "The Red Light"

Big Pun - Endangered Species
 "Mamma"

Cormega - The Realness
 "Fallen Soldiers" (Remix)

Guru - Baldhead Slick & Da Click
 "In Here"
 "Collecting Props"

Casual - He Think He Raw
 "I Gotta (Get Down)"

Jadakiss - Kiss tha Game Goodbye
 "We Gonna Make It"
 "Feel Me"

Lyrics Of Fury Vol. 1
 "Boy's About To Flip"
 "Dark Riders"
 "Permanent Scars"
 "Metal's Advocate"

Fat Joe - Jealous Ones Still Envy (J.O.S.E.)
 "Definition of a Don"

Dilated Peoples - Expansion Team
 "Live on Stage"
 "Worst Comes to Worst"
 "Panic"

Swollen Members - Bad Dreams
 "Bad Dreams"
 "Dark Riders"

Ghostface Killah - Bulletproof Wallets
 "The Forest"
 "The Juks"
 "Street Chemistry"

Mobb Deep - Infamy
 "Get at Me"

Agallah - Da Mixtape Iz The Album
 "Sun You Know How It Goes"

Buc Fifty - Locked Down
 "Scandalous" (featuring J-Ro)
 "Locked Down"
 "Buc Buc Buc"

Lake Entertainment Presents: The 41st Side

 "Crush Linen" (Lake)
 "Let 'Em Hang" (Nas, Lake & V12)
 "We Gon' Buck" (Cormega, Capone-N-Noreaga & Lake)

R2K Version 1.0
 "Worst Enemy" (Buc Fifty)

Tha Eastsidaz - Duces 'n Trayz: The Old Fashioned Way
 "Friends" (featuring Kokane)
 "Connected" (featuring Mobb Deep & Kokane)

2002

Styles P - A Gangster and a Gentleman
 "A Gangster and a Gentleman"
 "Black Magic"

Nas - The Lost Tapes
 "My Way"
 "No Idea's Original"

Cormega - The True Meaning
 "The Legacy"

Crimewave - "Scripturewon: The Beginning of"
 "Johnny"

Fat Joe - Loyalty
 "Bust at You"

Linkin Park - Reanimation
 "Frgt/10"

Nas - God's Son
 "Book of Rhymes"
 "Mastermind"
 "Revolutionary Warfare"
 "Thugz Mirror (Freestyle)"

Infamous Mobb - Special Edition
 "Intro"
 "IM³"
 "Killa Queens"
 "Special Edition"
 "The Family" (Skit)
 "Mobb Niggaz (The Sequel)"
 "Back in the Days"
 "B.I.G. - T.W.I.N.S."
 "We Strive"
 "Reality Rap"

D&D Crew - D&D Project II
 "Kill It"

50 Cent - Wanksta VLS
 "Wanksta (Alchemist Remix)"

Snoop Dogg presents: Doggystyle All-Stars - Welcome To Tha House Vol. 1
 "Hey You!"

Big Daddy Kane - Duck Season Vol. 1
 "The Man, The Icon"

Dilated Peoples - The Alchemist Presents Heavy Surveillance
 "Heavy Surveillance"
 "Thieves (featuring Prodigy)

Cypress Hill - Stash EP
 "Rap Superstar (Alchemist Remix)"

Royce Da 5'9" - Rock City
 "D-Elite Pt.2"

Buc Fifty - Battle Axe Warriors II
 "Bangin'"

Saigon
 "We Da Click" (featuring Big Twins)

2003

Sheek Louch - Walk Witt Me
 "Turn It Up"

Big Noyd - Only the Strong
 "Only the Strong"
 "Shoot 'Em Up (Bang Bang) Part 1"
 "Noyd Holdin' It Down"
 "Shoot 'Em Up (Bang Bang) Part 2"
 "Air It Out"
 "N.O.Y.D."

PMD - The Awakening
 "The Awakening"

Royce Da 5'9" - Build & Destroy: The Lost Sessions
 "U Don't Know Me"
 "I Won't Be"

Prodigy & Big Twins - Beef OST
 "Drama"

Mobb Deep - Free Agents: The Murda Mixtape
 "The Illest"
 "Backwards"
 "Serious"
 "Fourth Of July"

Raze - Fallback
 "Fallback"

Prozack Turner - Death, Taxes and Prozack
 "Dear Old Dad"

Million - Million A.K.A. Endiana Jonez
 "No Matta"
 "Da Drama"

Craig G - This Is Now!!!
 "Wrong Chick"

Mobb Deep
 "The Thirst"

State Property - The Chain Gang Vol. 2
 "Still in Effect" (featuring Freeway & Neef)

2004

Saigon - Warning Shots
 "Stocking Cap"
 "Yes"

Poverty - Rise From Ruin
 "Rise From Ruin"
 "The Pawn"
 "Life Sucks"

Uno Dos - Amongst the Elite
 "Niggaz Ain't Built"

Papoose - Election Day (Papoose for the Streets)
 "Two Step (featuring Prodigy & Grafh)

Dilated Peoples - Neighborhood Watch
 "Marathon"
 "Neighborhood Watch"
 "Poisonous"
 "World On Wheels"

Cypress Hill - Till Death Do Us Part
 "Latin Thugs"

Infamous Mobb - Blood Thicker Than Water Vol. 1
 "Gunz Up"

Mobb Deep - Amerikaz Nightmare
 "Win or Lose"
 "Got It Twisted"
 "When U Hear The"
 "Got It Twisted (Remix)"

Nelly - Sweat
 "Playa"

Snoop Dogg - R&G (Rhythm & Gangsta): The Masterpiece
 "(Intro) I Love to Give You Light"

Jadakiss - Kiss of Death
 "Still Feel Me"

Capone
 "Ghetto Fame"

Mobb Deep
 "Havoc's Theme"

2005

AP.9 - Mac Dre Presents Thizz Nation Volume 4
 "In My Life"

Diamond D - The Diamond Mine
 "Y'all Niggaz Need to Know"

Sheek Louch - After Taxes
 "Movie Niggas"

Big Shug - Who's Hard?
 "Who? (Got My Back)"
 "Who's Hard?"

Elzhi - Witness My Growth
 "The Alchemist"

113 - 113 Degrés
 "L'école du Crime (featuring Mobb Deep)"

Tragedy Khadafi - Thug Matrix
 "Stay Free (featuring Littles)"
 "Love Is Love (featuring Jinx)"

Jae Millz - Back To The Future
 "Take A Betta Look"

Chryme Fam - The EP XL
 "Street Shit"

Big Noyd - On The Grind
 "Louder (featuring Prodigy)"

Saigon
 "E.A.T."

2006

B-Real - The Gunslinger, Pt. II: Fist Full of Dollars
 "Put On Your Vest (featuring Defari)

Pitch Black - Revenge
 "Put That Work In"

Nashawn - Napalm
 "Write Your Name"

Big Noyd - The Stick Up Kid
 "That's How You Get Dead"

Defari - Street Music
 "Make My Own"

Swollen Members - Black Magic
 "Weight"

Styles P - Time is Money
 "I'm Black (featuring Floetry)"

Cam'ron - Killa Season
 "Wet Wipes"

Dilated Peoples - 20/20
 "Back Again"
 "20/20"

Agallah - You Already Know
 "Ride Out (O.G.G.G.)"
 "On the Ave"

Eminem - The Re-Up
 "We Ride for Shady" (Obie Trice featuring Cashis)
 "There He Is" (Bobby Creekwater)
 "Tryin' ta Win" (Stat Quo)

Mobb Deep - Blood Money
 "The Infamous"

Planet Asia - The Medicine
 "Over Your Head" (Produced with Evidence)

Ras Kass - Eat or Die
 "Get It In"

Raze - Full Scale: G-Check
 "Bosses"

Hollow Da Don - Houston To NY
 "Hold Me Down"

Scarface & The Product - One Hunid
 "G-Type"

Mistah F.A.B. - Recess (A Play Your Position Extra)
 "Fuck A Chorus"

Blaq Poet - Rewind: Deja Screw
 "Bloody Mess"

2007

Cormega - Who Am I?
 "Who Am I"
 "718" (not LP version)

Prodigy - Return of the Mac
 Whole album

Joell Ortiz - The Brick: Bodega Chronicles
 "BQE"

Dilated Peoples - The Release Party
 "Spit It Clearly"

Tragedy Khadafi - The Death of Tragedy
 "Milk Murder"

N.O.R.E. - Cocaine On Steroids
 "Drink Champ"

Pharoahe Monch - Desire
 "Desire (featuring Showtyme)"

Evidence - The Weatherman LP
 "Letyourselfgo (featuring The Alchemist)"
 "Chase the Clouds Away"
 "Evidence is Everywhere"
 "Line of Scrimmage"
 "Born in LA"

Styles P - Super Gangster (Extraordinary Gentleman)
 "Green Piece of Paper"
 "All I Know is Pain (featuring The Alchemist"

Prodigy - The Pre Mac
 "That's Why Nigga"
 "550 Benz"
 "Straight Murder (featuring 50 Cent)"
 "What A Real Mobb Do (featuring Big Twins)"

Infamous Mobb - Reality Rap
 "Reality Rap"
 "Hustle Hard (featuring The Alchemist)

Illa Ghee - Bullet & a Bracelet
 "Maintenance Man"

2008

AX - Con (PSP Game OST)
 "The Champ"

La The Darkman - Return of the Darkman
 "Fresh Flowers"

DJ Muggs & Planet Asia - Pain Language
 "Pain Language (Alchemist remix)

Fat Joe - The Elephant in the Room
 "My Conscience (featuring KRS-One)"

Prodigy - H.N.I.C. Pt. 2
 "The Life"
 "Young Veterans"
 "Illuminati"
 "Veteran's Memorial Part II"
 "Dirty New Yorker (featuring Havoc)"
 "Represent Me"
 "The Dough"

Lil Wayne - Tha Carter III
 "You Ain't Got Nuthin" (featuring Fabolous & Juelz Santana)
 "Let Us Pray (featuring Juelz Santana)" (Tha Carter 3 Sessions)

I.A.Dap - Lil' Dap
 "Intro I.A.Dap"
 "Get It"

Termanology - Politics As Usual
 "Hood Shit (featuring Prodigy)"

Fresh Rhymes & Videotape Vol. 1
 "The Last Shall Be First" (Dilated Peoples)
 "Left Out In The Cold" (Aceyalone, The Alchemist, 88-Keys)

Bekay - Hunger Pains
 "I Am"
 "I Am (Remix)"

Evidence - The Layover EP
 "So Fresh (featuring The Alchemist)"
 "The Far Left (featuring The Alchemist & Fashawn)"
 "To Be Determined (featuring Aloe Blacc & Elzhi)"

2009

Fashawn - The Antidote
All tracks.

B-Real - Smoke N Mirrors
 "6 Minutes (featuring Young De & Tekneek)"

Capone-N-Noreaga - Channel 10
 "Follow the Dollar"

Jadakiss - The Last Kiss
 "Death Wish (featuring Lil Wayne)"

Soul Assassins - Intermission
 "Classical (featuring Evidence & Sick Jacken)"
 "Gunshots (featuring The Alchemist & Chace Infinite)"

La Coka Nostra - A Brand You Can Trust
 "Choose Your Side (featuring Bun B)"

Fabolous - Loso's Way
 "Lullaby"

Slaughterhouse -Slaughterhouse
 "Microphone"

Raekwon - Only Built 4 Cuban Linx II
 "Surgical Gloves"

Termanology - Hood Politics VI: Time Machine
 "I See Dead People"

Big Twins - The Project Kid
 "When I Walk Away (featuring The Alchemist)"
 "Wanna Be Down"
 "Smart Niggaz (featuring Krondon)"

2010

B.o.B - May 25th
 "Gladiators (featuring J. Cole)"

Cam'ron & Vado - Boss of All Bosses 2.5
 "Ya' Killin' Me" (featuring Kid Cudi)

Capone-N-Noreaga - The War Report 2: Report the War
 "Pain"

Capone-N-Noreaga
 "How We Keep It"

Ca$hulty
 "Salute"

DJ Kayslay - More Than Just a DJ
 "Hustle Game" (featuring Bun B, Webbie, Lil Boosie & Nicole Wray)

Gangrene - Gutter Water
 "Not High Enough"
 "Gutter Water (featuring Raekwon)"
 "Get Into Some Gangster Shit (featuring Planet Asia)"
 "Chain Swinging"
 "Breathing Down Yo Neck (featuring M.E.D.)"
 "From Another Orbit (featuring Roc C)"
 "Standing In The Shadows"
 "Brass Knuckle Rap (featuring Guilty Simpson)"

Gangrene - Sawblade EP
 "Freshest Rhymes"
 "Operating Room"

Hollow Da Don - Money Changes, Loyalty Don't
 "Greatness"

Inspectah Deck - Manifesto
 "The Champion"

Mobb Deep
 "Whole Lotta Thug"

Planet Asia & Gold Chain Military - Chain Of Command
 "GCM Meets ALC"

Raekwon - Cocainism Vol. 2
 "Big Beat"
 "Wallys & Pringles"

Rakaa from Dilated Peoples - Crown of Thorns
 "Upstairs"
 "Aces High (featuring Evidence, Defari & Fashawn"

Ras Kass - A.D.I.D.A.S. (All Day I Dream About Spittin)
 "Linguistics"

Roc C - Scapegoat
 "I'm Ready (featuring Glasses Malone)

Roc C
 "Story Master"

Shawn Chrystopher
 "Just Me N You"

Statik Selektah - The Left-Overs (of Whats To Come) EP
 "On The Corner" (featuring Big Twins, Freddie Gibbs, Planet Asia & Tri-State)

Styles P - The Green Ghost Project
 "Make Millions From Entertainment"

2011

Blu - j e s u s
 "d o o w h o p +"

ChrisCo - How Does It Feel EP
Intro
We Run It (featuring Jon Connor & Marv Won)
Drop That (featuring Crooked I & Young Knox)
How Does It Feel
A Different High (featuring Obie Trice & Killa Kyleon)

Curren$y - Covert Coup
BBS
The Type (featuring Prodigy)
Blood Sweat and Gears (featuring Fiend)
Life Instructions (featuring Smoke DZA)
Smoke Break
Scottie Pippens (featuring Freddie Gibbs)
Ventilation
Double 07
Success Is My Cologne
Full Metal

Dirt Nasty - Nasty As I Wanna Be
 "As Nasty As I Wanna Be"

Evidence - Cats & Dogs
 The Liner Notes (featuring Aloe Blacc)
 The Red Carpet (featuring Raekwon, Ras Kass)
 James Hendrix (Evidence & The Alchemist, as "StepBrothers")
 Crash
 Where You Come From? (featuring Rakaa Iriscience, Lil' Fame, Termanology)
 Sleep Deprivation

Hollow Da Don - Loyalty is a Way of Life
 "Hollow Ta Con (featuring Conceited)"

Kool G Rap - Riches, Royalty, Respect
 "American Nightmare (featuring Havoc)

M.E.D. - Bang Your Head 3 (Special Edition)
 "Bounce Back"

M.E.D. - Classic
 "War & Love (featuring Oh No)"

Mobb Deep - Black Cocaine (EP)
 "Get It Forever (featuring Nas)"
 "Black Cocaine"
 "Waterboarding"

Mobb Deep 
 "Love Ya’ll More"
 "Dog Shit (featuring Nas)"

N.O.R.E. - Scared Money EP
 "Slime Father" (feat. Cory Gunz)

Prodigy - The Ellsworth Bumpy Johnson EP
 "The One And Only"
 "For One Night Only"

Prodigy
 "When U Up"

Raekwon - Shaolin vs. Wu-Tang
 "Ferry Boat Killaz"

Reks - Rhythmatic Eternal King Supreme
 "Why Cry (featuring Styles P)"

Rick Ross
 "Perfectionist (featuring Meek Mill)"

Roc C - Stoned Genius
 "Starchild (featuring The Alchemist)"

Roc Marciano & Gangrene - Greneberg
 "Papercuts"
 "Sewer Gravy"
 "Hoard 90"

Royce Da 5'9" - Success Is Certain
 "I Ain't Coming Down"

Sir Michael Rocks - Premier Politics
 "Neiman Marcus"
 "She Gotta Have It"

STS - The Illustrious
 "The Interview"

2012

Awar - The Laws of Nature
 "Tunnel Vision"
 "I Arrived" (featuring Latoiya Williams)
 "Strictly Business"
 "Cut Throat Rap" (featuring Roc Marciano & Grafh)

Battles - Dross Glop 2
 "Futura (The Alchemist remix)"

Bishop Lamont - The Layover
 "I Swear" (featuring Royce Da 5'9" & Swish)

Bodega Bamz - Strictly 4 My P.A.P.I.Z.
 "Tres Puntos" (featuring A$ton Matthews)

Dave East - No Regrets 

 "Waste My Time"

Domo Genesis - No Idols 
 "Prophecy"
 "Fuck Everybody Else"
 "All Alone"
 "Elimination Chamber" (featuring Earl Sweatshirt, Vince Staples & Action Bronson)
 "Power Ballad" (featuring Smoke DZA)
 "Me and My Bitch"
 "Till the Angels Come" (featuring Freddie Gibbs & Prodigy)
 "Daily News" (featuring Space Ghost Purp, Earl Sweatshirt & Action Bronson)
 "Gamebreaker" (featuring Earl Sweatshirt)
 "The Feeling"
 "No Idols" (featuring Tyler The Creator)

Durag Dynasty
 "Glass of Astonishment"
 "The World's Most Dangerous"
 "Spudnik Webb" (featuring Blu & Killa Kali)

Gangrene - Vodka & Ayahuasca
 "Drink Up" (featuring Roc Marciano)
 "Dump Truck" (featuring Prodigy)
 "Due Work" 
 "Dark Shades" (featuring Evidence & Roc C)
 "Livers for Sale"
 "Dream Nap"

Hodgy Beats - Untitled EP
 "Cookie Coma"
 "In a Dream"

Joey FaTTs - Chipper Jones Vol. 2
 "Wave Matthews Band" (featuring A$AP Yams & Da$h)

Meyhem Lauren - Mandatory Brunch Meetings
 "Brand Name Marijuana"

Prodigy - H.N.I.C. 3
 "Without Rhyme Or Reason"
 "Slept On"
 "Live"
 "Serve Em"

Prodigy - The Bumpy Johnson Album
 "The One and Only"
 "Medicine Man"
 "For One Night Only"

Roc Marciano - Reloaded
 "Flash Gordon"
 "Pistolier"
 "Paradise For Pimps"

Sean Price - Mic Tyson
 "Genesis of the Omega"
 "Bar-Barian"
 "STFU Part 2"
 "Bully Rap" (featuring Realm Reality)

Action Bronson and The Alchemist - Rare Chandeliers
 "Big Body Bes (Intro)"
 "Rare Chandeliers"
 "The Symbol"
 "Sylvester Lundgren" (featuring Meyhem Lauren & Ag Da Coroner)
 "Randy The Musical"
 "Demolition Men" (featuring Schoolboy Q)
 "Eggs On The Third Floor"
 "Modern Day Revelations" (featuring Roc Marciano)
 "Dennis Haskins"
 "Bitch I Deserve You" (featuring Evidence)
 "Gateway To Wizardy" (featuring Styles P)
 "Blood Of The Goat" (featuring Big Twin & Sean Price)
 "Mike Vick"
 "Feinds Jean Jacket"
 "Drugs & Cheese on a Roll Mix"
 "Brown Bag Wrap"

Schoolboy Q - Habits & Contradictions
 "My Homie"

Slaughterhouse - On the House
 "All On Me"

Styles P - The Diamond Life Project
 "The Myth"

Termanology & Lil' Fame - Fizzyology
 "Fizzyology"

The Alchemist - Russian Roulette 
Entire album

The Alchemist - Yacht Rock (EP) 
(Side A) (featuring Action Bronson, Roc Marciano & Oh No)
(Side B) (featuring Big Twins, Chuck Inglish & Blu)

Willie The Kid - The Cure 2
 "Waste Not.Want Not"

2013

Durag Dynasty - 360 Waves
 "The Next One (Intro)"
 "Durag Dynasty Theme "  
 "Tender Greens"
 "Fish Meat" (featuring Prodigy)
 "360 Waves"
 "Trailer Mix" (featuring Phil The Agony)
 "Spiral Event" (featuring Evidence)
 "Yasir Arafat Prelude"
 "Yasir Arafat"
 "Tetrahydrons on Mars" (featuring Chace Infinite)
 "Goon Call" (featuring Imam Thug) 
 "Bigger U Are The Harder You Fall" (featuring Big Twinz & Alchemist)
 "Shooters"
 "Luxury Whip"
 "Funyons"

Domo Genesis
 "Drugs Got Me Spiritual" (featuring Remy Banks)

Prodigy - Albert Einstein
 "Intro"  	
 "IMDKV"  	
 "Give Em Hell"  	
 "Stay Dope"  	
 "Curb Ya Dog"  	
 "Death Sentence" (featuring Roc Marciano)	
 "Bear Meat"  	
 "Y.N.T." (featuring Domo Genesis)	
 "R.I.P." (featuring Havoc & Raekwon)	
 "Dough Pildin"  	
 "Confessions"  
 "Bible Paper" (featuring The Alchemist)
 "The One" (featuring Action Bronson) (co-prod. by Adrian Younge)
 "Breeze"  	
 "Raw Forever"  	
 "Say My Name"

The Alchemist - SSUR (EP)
 "Camp Registration" (featuring Step Brothers, Action Bronson, Blu & Domo Genesis) (co-prod. by Bombay Da Realest Music)
 "1010 Wins" (featuring Domo Genesis, Action Bronson, Meyhem Lauren, Roc Marciano & Despot)
 "Tesla" (featuring Domo Genesis, Freddie Gibbs & Hodgy Beats)

Mac Miller - Watching Movies with the Sound Off
 "Red Dot Music" (featuring Action Bronson)

Statik Selektah - Extended Play
Live From The Era (featuring Pro Era) (co-prod. by Statik Selektah & Alchemist)

Joey Bada$$ - Summer Knights
 "Trap Door"

Willie The Kid - Masterpiece Theatre (EP)
 "Opening Credits"
 "Shake Dice"
 "Halal Tuna"
 "Bad Mistake" (featuring The Alchemist)
 "Medusa" (featuring Action Bronson & Roc Marciano)
 "Gettysburg"
 "Let The Money Stay"

Earl Sweatshirt - Doris
 "Uncle Al"

Agallah - Red V 
 "Identity Theft"

Step Brothers
 "Nothing To See / Hear" (co-prod. by Evidence)
 "Ron Carter"

Boldy James - My 1st Chemistry Set
 "Bold"
 "Consideration"
 "Moochie"
 "Traction" (featuring Action Bronson)
 "Surprise Party" (featuring King Chip & Freeway)
 "What's The Word"
 "Rappies" (featuring Peechie Green & Mafia Double Dee)
 "Cobo Hall"
 "Give Me A Reason" (featuring Vince Staples)
 "400 Thousand"
 "Reform School" (featuring Earl Sweatshirt, Domo Genesis & Da$h)
 "KY Jellybeans"

Roc Marciano - The Pimpire Strikes Back
 "Sincerely Antique" (featuring Action Bronson & Willie The Kid)
 "Ten Toes Down" (featuring Knowledge The Pirate)

2014

Agallah - Past and Present 
 "Open Invitation"
 "The Gods Must Be Crazy"

Step Brothers - Lord Steppington 
 "More Wins"
 "Dr. Kimble"
 "Legendary Mesh"
 "No Hesitation" (featuring Styles P)
 "Swimteam Rastas"
 "Mums In The Garage" (featuring Action Bronson)
 "See The Rich Man Play" (featuring Roc Marciano)
 "Banging Sound" (featuring Fashawn)
 "Step Masters"
 "Tomorrow" (featuring Rakaa & Blu)
 "Draw Something" (featuring Oh No)
 "Buzzing Away"
 "Just Step"
 "String Cheese"
 "Bally Shoe" (featuring Psycho Les & Fargo)

Schoolboy Q - Oxymoron 
 "Break the Bank"

Prodigy - The Most Infamous 
 "Not a Stan"
 "Do or Die"

Prodigy - Albert Einstein: P=mc2 (Bonus EP) 
 "Mightier Pen"
 "Infamous Allegiance"
 "Gnarly"
 "Murder Goes Down"

A$ton Matthews - A$ton 3:16 
 "Money, Mackin, Murda"

Mobb Deep - The Infamous Mobb Deep 
 "Lifetime"

Various Artists - The Boondocks Mixtape (Season 4) 
 Killer Mike - "The Boonies"

D.I.T.C. - The Remix Project 
 "We All (Alchemist Remix)" (featuring O.C. & A.G.)

Trash Talk - No Peace 
 "Amnesiatic"
 "Reprieve"

Big Twins - TG1 
 "Fuck All Ya"

Dilated Peoples - Directors of Photography 
 "Cut My Teeth"
 "L.A. River Drive" (featuring Sick Jacken)

Earl Sweatshirt 
 "45"

Termanology - Shut Up And Rap 
 "El Wave" (featuring Willie The Kid & Reks) (co-prod. by Statik Selektah & Alchemist)

Militainment - N.O.R.E. Presents: DRINKS 
 "Change Ya Life" (featuring N.O.R.E., Cityboy Dee, Sanogram & Smoova)

Fashawn - FASH-ionably Late 
 "Po For President"
 "Dreams" (featuring Evidence)
 "Professor F"
 "Amen"
 "The Plantation"
 "Songs In F Major"
 "Never Waiting In Vein"

2015

Blu - Soul Amazing (Part Five) (The Alchemist Edition) 
 "Cobb"
 "Palisades" (featuring Big Twin, Killa Kali & Planet Asia)

Fashawn - The Ecology 
 "Letter F"

Action Bronson - Mr. Wonderful 
 "Terry"
 "Falconry" (featuring Meyhem Lauren & Big Body Bes)
 "Galactic Love"

Leftover
 "Big League Chew"

Ab-Soul 
 "47 Bars"

Earl Sweatshirt & Action Bronson 
 "Warlord Leather"

Big Twins - Thrive 2 
 "Live Life"

The Alchemist & Oh No (Gangrene) - Welcome to Los Santos 
 Gangrene - "Play It Cool" (featuring Samuel T Herring & Earl Sweatshirt)
 Tunde Adebimpe - "Speedline Miracle Masterpiece" (featuring Sal P & Sinkane) (produced with Josh Werner & Sinkane)
 Phantogram - "K.Y.S.A." (produced with Josh Carter)
 MNDR - "Lock + Load" (featuring Killer Mike)
 Wavves - "Leave"
 Currensy & Freddie Gibbs - "Fetti"
 Action Bronson & Danny Brown - "Bad News"

Gangrene - You Disgust Me 
 "Sheet Music" (featuring Sean Price & Havoc, co-prod. by Party Supplies)
 "The Man with the Horn"
 "Noon Chuckas"
 "Just for Decoration" (featuring Evidence & Chuck Strangers)
 "The Hidden Hand"

Joey Bada$$ 
"Aim High" (prod. by Harry Fraud & Alchemist)

Eearz - Eearz To Da Streets 
 "Chain Reaction" (prod. by Alchemist & Mike WiLL Made-It)

The Game - The Documentary 2.5 
 "Like Father Like Son 2" (featuring Busta Rhymes)

50 Cent - The Kanan Tape 
 "Body Bags"

2016

The Alchemist - Craft Singles (45 Vinyl Series)
 Schoolboy Q - "Hoover Street (Original Version)"
 MC Eiht & Spice 1 - "Any Means"
 MC Eiht & Spice 1 - "Supply"
 Blu - "Cobb"
 Blu - "Palisades"
 Migos & Mac Miller - "Jabroni"
 Roc Marciano - "All for It"
 Curren$y & Lil Wayne - "Fat Albert"

Curren$y & The Alchemist - The Carrollton Heist
 "Cartridge"
 "Black Rally Stripes"
 "Vibrations"
 "Disappearing Ink" (featuring Styles P)
 "Inspiration" (featuring Action Bronson)
 "500 Pounds of Gas"
 "The Mack Book"
 "93 AMG"
 "Fat Albert" (featuring Lil Wayne)
 "Smoking in the Rain"

Your Old Droog
 "Hip-Hop Head"

Smoke DZA - He Has Risen
 "It's Real" (co-prod. by Harry Fraud & Alchemist)

AG Da Coroner - Sip The Nectar
 "The Stick Up"

Westside Gunn - FLYGOD
 "Dudley Boyz" (featuring Action Bronson)

Kempi - Rap 'n Glorie
 "Herder"
 "Ik Wil Nikes" (featuring Willem)
 "King Kong / Observeer" (featuring Klemma)
 "D Boy"

Durag Dynasty
 "Class Picture" (featuring Domo Genesis)

Meyhem Lauren - Piatto D'Oro
 "Dragon vs. Wolf" (featuring Action Bronson)

Griselda Records - Don't Get Scared Now
 "Ajax" (Westside Gunn & Conway)

Havoc & The Alchemist - The Silent Partner
 "Impose My Will"
 "Maintain (Fuck How You Feel)"
 "Out the Frame"
 "Seize Power"
 "Never Trust a Soul"
 "The Gun Holds a Drum" (featuring Prodigy)
 "Smooth Ride Music"
 "Buck 50's & Bullet Wounds" (featuring Method Man)
 "Just Being Me"
 "Throw in the Towel"
 "Hear Me Now" (featuring Cormega)

Smoke DZA - George Kush Da Button (Don't Pass Trump The Blunt)
 "GT Performer" (featuring Action Bronson & Green R Fieldz)

Jace
 "On My Way" (featuring OG Maco)

Schoolboy Q - Blank Face LP
 "Kno Ya Wrong" (featuring Lance Skiiiwalker)

Reks - The Greatest X
 "Kites"

Cohen@Mushon - Yamim Arukim / ימים ארוכים
 "Ein Shum Be'aya" / "אין שום בעיה" (featuring Michael Swissa)

Action Bronson
 "Descendant of the Stars (Traveling the Stars Theme)"

Danny Brown - Atrocity Exhibition
 "White Lines"

Curren$y & The Alchemist - The Carrollton Heist Remixed
 "Drowsy (Remix)" (featuring Action Bronson)

2017

The Alchemist - Craft Singles (45 Vinyl Series)
 Mach-Hommy - "Brand Name"

Prodigy - Hegelian Dialectic (The Book of Revelation)
 "Mystic"

Quelle Chris - Being You Is Great, I Wish I Could Be You More Often
 "Pendulum Swing" (featuring Homeboy Sandman)

Your Old Droog - Packs
 "Winston Red"

Kendrick Lamar
 "The Heart Part 4" (produced with Syk Sense, Axlfolie, & DJ Dahi)

Mach-Hommy
 "Warning Shot"

Kendrick Lamar - DAMN.
 "FEAR."

Jay Worthy - Fantasy Island
 "Stepping Out" (featuring $Ha Hef)
 "Lost My Lex"
 "Rising Sun" (featuring Rugotti)
 "Boomerang" (featuring Polo100 & Big Body Bes) (produced with Budgie Beats)
 "Lil Freaks" (featuring Rugotti)
 "Miss You" (featuring Conway The Machine)
 "Four Fifteens" (featuring Meyhem Lauren & Ray Wright)

MF DOOM - The Missing Notebook Rhymes
 "DOOMSAYERS"

Sean Price - Imperius Rex
 "Imperius Rex"

Action Bronson - Blue Chips 7000
 "La Luna" (produced with Woody Jackson)
 "TANK" (featuring Big Body Bes)

Westside Gunn & MF DOOM - WESTSIDEDOOM
 "2Stings"

Statik Selektah - 8
 "Disrespekt" (featuring Prodigy) (produced with Statik Selektah)

2018

Evidence - Weather or Not
 Throw it All Away
 Powder Cocaine (featuring Slug and Catero)
 Sell Me This Pen (featuring The Alchemist and Mach Hommy)
 Love is a Funny Thing (featuring Styles P, Rapsody, and Khrysis)

The Alchemist - Lunch Meat EP
 Dean Martin Steaks (featuring Roc Marciano)
 Judas (featuring Westside Gunn & Conway)
 The Hopeless Romantic (featuring Action Bronson)
 Massacre (featuring Styles P & Benny The Butcher)

Compound
 Budz (featuring Westside Gunn & Conway)

Westside Gunn - Supreme Blientele
 Elizabeth
 Mean Gene
 Brossface Brippler (featuring Benny The Butcher and Busta Rhymes)

The Alchemist - Craft Singles (45 Vinyl Series)
 Roc Marciano - "In Case You Forgot"
 Wiz Khalifa - "Universal Studios"

alt-J - Reduxer
 Deadcrush (featuring Danny Brown) (Produced by the Alchemist & Trooko)

Roc Marciano - Behold A Dark Horse
 Fabio

Curren$y, Freddie Gibbs & The Alchemist - Fetti
 Location Remote
 The Blow
 New Thangs
 Saturday Night Special
 Now & Later Gators
 No Window Tints
 Willie Lloyd
 Tapatio
 Bundy & Sincere

The Alchemist - Fork In The Pot / 94' Ghost Shit 12"
 Fork In The Pot (featuring Westside Gunn, Conway, & ScHoolboy Q)
 94' Ghost Shit (featuring Westside Gunn & Conway)

Westside Gunn - Hitler Wears Hermes VI
 Gigis
 Niggas in Puerto Rico (featuring Benny The Butcher and Flee Lord)

Benny The Butcher - Tana Talk 3
 Rubber Bands & Weight
 Broken Bottles
 97 Hov (Produced by Daringer & The Alchemist)
 Fifty One (featuring Westside Gunn)

The Alchemist - BREAD EP
 Ray Mysterio (featuring Westside Gunn & Conway)
 Roman Candles (featuring Black Thought & Roc Marciano)
 Mac 10 Wounds (featuring Conway)
 E. Coli (featuring Earl Sweatshirt)

Conway the Machine - EIF2: Eat What You Kill!
 224 May Block
 Overdose

2019

Meyhem Lauren
 Still Playing Celo

A.G., O.C., & The Alchemist
 We All (Alchemist Remix)

Anderson Paak - Ventura
 Make it Better (featuring Smokey Robinson) (Produced by Anderson Paak, Fredwreck & The Alchemist)

Westside Gunn - Flygod Is An Awesome God
 Sensational Sherri

Benny The Butcher - The Plugs I Met
 Took the Money to the Plug House
 5 To 50 (featuring India)

Nas - The Lost Tapes II
 It Never Ends

The Cool Kids & The Alchemist - Layups
 Layups
 Polansky (featuring Boldy James & Shorty K)
 WTF (featuring Boldy James)

Westside Gunn - Hitler Wears Hermes 7
 Kool G (featuring Conway The Machine & Benny The Butcher) (Produced with Daringer)
 Lucha Bros (featuring Curren$y & Benny The Butcher)
 Outro

Earl Sweatshirt - Feet of Clay
 Mtomb (featuring Liv.E)
2020 Deluxe Edition
 Whole World (featuring Maxo)

Action Bronson & The Alchemist - Lamb Over Rice
 Dmtri
 Sven
 Tear Away Shorts
 Accoutrements
 Descendant of the Stars 
 Just the Way It Is
 Arnold & Danny

Wiz Khalifa 
 Tequila Shots In The AM

Schoolboy Q
 W.Y.G.D.T.N.S.

Conway The Machine - Look What I Became
 No Woman No Kids

Alchemist - Yacht Rock 2
 Exclusive Vibe (Intro)	
 Uptown Aquarium (featuring Big Body Bes)	
 Tropical Storm Lenny (featuring Action Bronson)
 Sex At The Fountain-Bleu (featuring Meyhem Lauren)	
 Stugots (featuring Willie The Kid)	
 Boat Shoes (featuring Gangrene)	
 Ocean Prime (featuring Boldy James)	
 Harry O. (featuring Roc Marciano)	
 Sand Castles (featuring Benny The Butcher & El Camino	
 Eastside (featuring Westside Gunn & Conway The Machine)	
 Billy Dee (featuring Big Twins)	
 The Floating Hotel (Outro)

Boldy James & The Alchemist - Boldface EP
 Ill Advised
 Method To The Madness
 Summer nights
 Dinavolino (featuring The Cool Kids)
 My First Offense

Mach-Hommy - Wap Konn Jòj!
 Chiney Brush (featuring Quelle Chris)

2020

Eminem - Music to Be Murdered By
 Step Dad (Produced with Eminem & Luis Resto)

Boldy James & The Alchemist - The Price of Tea in China
 Carruth
 Giant Slide
 Surf & Turf (featuring Vince Staples)
 Run-ins
 Scrape The Bowl (featuring Benny the Butcher)
 Pinto
 Slow Roll
 S.N.O.R.T. (featuring Freddie Gibbs)
 Grey October (featuring Evidence) 
 Mustard
 Speed Demon Freestyle
 Phone Bill
(Deluxe Version)
 Pots and Pans (featuring The Cool Kids & Shorty K)
 Belvedere
 Bernadines
 Don Flamingo (featuring El Camino)

Jay Electronica - A Written Testimony
 "The Neverending Story" (featuring JAY-Z)

Conway the Machine & The Alchemist - LULU
 Intro
 14 KI's
 The Contract
 Shoot Sideways (featuring Schoolboy Q)
 Calvin
 They Got Sonny (featuring Cormega)
 Gold BBB's

Westside Gunn - Pray for Paris
 500 Dollar Ounces (featuring Freddie Gibbs & Roc Marciano)
 Claiborne Kick (featuring Boldy James)

Freddie Gibbs & The Alchemist - Alfredo
 1985
 God Is Perfect
 Scottie Beam (featuring Rick Ross)
 Look At Me
 Frank Lucas (featuring Benny the Butcher)
 Something to Rap About (featuring Tyler, the Creator)
 Baby $hit
 Babies & Fools (featuring Conway the Machine)
 Skinny Suge
 All Glass

Conway The Machine - From King to a God
 Dough & Damani (Produced with Daringer)

Action Bronson - Only for Dolphins
 Sergio

Westside Gunn - Who Made the Sunshine
 All Praises (featuring Boldy James & Jadakiss)
 Liz Loves Luger (featuring Armani Caesar)

2021

The Alchemist - Carry The Fire

 82 Days
 Water Beds
 Treetops & Pagodas
 Carry The Fire
 Win Or Go Home
 Intermission
 The Flying Man
 Closing Ceremony

Denzel Curry & Kenny Beats - UNLOCKED 1.5
 ’ Cosmic ’.m4a (featuring Joey Bada$$) (Produced with Kenny Beats)

Armand Hammer & The Alchemist - Haram

 Sir Benni Miles
 Roaches Don't Fly
 Black Sunlight (featuring KAYANA)
 Indian Summer
 Aubergine (featuring Fielded)
 God's Feet (co-produced with Earl Sweatshirt)
 Peppertree 
 Scaffolds
 Falling Out the Sky (featuring Earl Sweatshirt)
 Wishing Bad (featuring Curly Castro & Amani)
 Chicharrones (featuring Quelle Chris)
 Squeegee
 Robert Moses 
 Stonefruit

Conway the Machine - La Maquina
 200 Pies (featuring 2 Chainz)

The Alchemist - This Thing of Ours
 Nobles (featuring Earl Sweatshirt & Navy Blue)
 TV Dinners (featuring Boldy James and Sideshow)
 Holy Hell (featuring Pink Siifu & Maxo)
 Loose Change (featuring Earl Sweatshirt)

Boldy James & The Alchemist - Bo Jackson

 Double Hockey Sticks
 Turpentine
 Brickmile to Montana (featuring Benny the Butcher)
 E.P.M.D
 Steel Wool
 Photographic Memories (featuring Earl Sweatshirt & Roc Marciano)
 Speed Trap
 Diamond Dallas (featuring Stove God Cooks)
 Flight Risk
 Illegal Search & Seizure
 Fake Flowers (featuring Freddie Gibbs & Curren$y)
 3rd Person
 First 48 Freestyle
 Drug Zone

Westside Gunn - Hitler Wears Hermes 8: Side B

 Ostertag (featuring Stove God Cooks)

AZ - Doe or Die II

 Ritual (featuring Conway the Machine & Lil Wayne)

The Alchemist - This Things Of Ours 2

 Miracle Baby (featuring MAVI)
 Lossless (featuring MIKE)
 Flying Spirit (featuring Bruiser Brigade)
 Wildstyle (featuring Zelooperz)
 6 Five Heartbeats (featuring Vince Staples)

Zack Fox - shut the f*ck up talking to me

 Shut the f*ck up talking to me

Russ - CHOMP 2

 Distance (featuring Conway The Machine & Ghostface Killah)

Boldy James & The Alchemist - Super Tecmo Bo

 Level Tipping Scale
 No Laughing Matter
 Hot Water Tank (featuring ICECOLDBISHOP)
 Bumps and Bruises
 Great Adventures
 Moth In The Flame
 300 Fences
 Guilt
 Francois

The Alchemist - Cycles (Original Score)

 The Jump
 The Cold
 The Discomfort
 The Bravery
 The Void
 The Return

2022

Earl Sweatshirt - Sick! 

 Old Friend
 Lye

Dr. Dre - GTA Online: The Contract 

 Diamond Mind (featuring Nipsey Hussle and Ty Dolla $ign) (Produced with Dr. Dre)

Curren$y & The Alchemist - Continuance 

 Half Moon Mornings
 Reese's Cup
 No Yeast (featuring Boldy James)
 Obsession
 Corvette Rally Stripes (featuring Havoc and Wiz Khalifa)
 Whale Watching (featuring Styles P)
 The Tonight Show
 Signature Move
 Louis Baggage (featuring Babyface Ray)
 The Final Board
 Jodeci Tape
 Endurance Runners (featuring Larry June)
 Kool & The Gang

Conway The Machine - God Don't Make Mistakes 

 Piano Love
 God Don't Make Mistakes (featuring Annette Price)

The Alchemist - Craft Singles (45 Vinyl Series) 

 Kool G Rap - "Diesel"

Benny The Butcher - Tana Talk 4 

 Johnny P's Caddy (featuring J. Cole)
 Super Plug
 Weekend In The Perry's (featuring Boldy James)
 Thowy's Revenge
 Billy Joe
 Bust A Brick Nick
 Mr. Chow Hall

Action Bronson - Cocodrillo Turbo 

 Estaciones (featuring Hologram)
 Jaws
 Subzero

Armand Hammer - WHT LBL 

 Shellfish
 Resin

Kendrick Lamar - Mr. Morale & the Big Steppers 

 We Cry Together (featuring Taylour Paige)

Rick Hyde - Stima 

 Poza (featuring Rome Streetz)

Elucid - I Told Bessie 

 Nostrand (featuring Billy Woods)

Roc Marciano & The Alchemist - The Elephant Man's Bones 

 Rubber Hand Grip
 Daddy Kane (featuring Action Bronson)
 Deja Vu
 Quantum Leap
 The Elephant Man's Bones
 Bubble Bath
 Liquid Coke
 Trillion Cut (featuring Boldy James)
 The Horns of Abraxas (featuring Ice-T)
 JJ Flash
 Zig Zag Zig
 Stigmata
 Zip Guns (featuring Knowledge The Pirate)
 Think Big

Black Soprano Family - Long Live DJ Shay 

 Pandemic Flow (Rick Hyde, Conway The Machine, Cory Gunz)

Freddie Gibbs - $oul $old $eperately 

 Blackest In The Room

Cormega - The Realness II 

 Glorious (featuring Nas)

Westside Gunn - 10 

 Red Death (featuring Benny The Butcher, Conway The Machine, Stove God Cooks, Rome Streetz, Armani Caeser, Jay Worthy and Robby Takac)

Rome Streetz - Kiss The Ring 

 Long Story Short

References

Discographies of American artists
Hip hop discographies
Production discographies